Pappanamcode(Abode of Mahouts) is a locality  of Thiruvananthapuram, the capital of Kerala, India. Only 5 km from Trivandrum central railway station and bus stand. It is one of the major industrial centres in Trivandrum.

Location
Located on NH 47 en route to Nagercoil, it is approximately 5 km from Thampanoor, where the Trivandrum Central railway station and the KSRTC central bus stand are located. Distance from the airport is roughly 15 km. KSRTC's Central Workshop is situated here, along with a KSRTC bus depot. Other offices include those of Bharat Sanchar Nigam Limited, Kerala State Financial Enterprises, Regional Research Laboratory (NIIST - CSIR), and Sree Chitra Thirunal College of Engineering. All buses to Kaliyikkavila, Neyyattinkara, Nagercoil and Kanyakumari pass via Pappanamcode except buses through bypass.

Co-ordinates

Prominent Institutions
 Sree Chitra Thirunal College of Engineering
 Regional Research Laboratory (CSIR)
 Mannam Memorial Residential Higher Secondary School
 NSS Women's College
 KSRTC Central Workshop

References

External links
 About Pappanamcode

Suburbs of Thiruvananthapuram